Brodiaea coronaria is the type species of Brodiaea and also known by the common names harvest brodiaea and crown brodiaea. It is native to western North America from British Columbia to northern California, where it grows in mountains and grasslands.

Description

Brodiaea coronaria is a perennial herb growing from a corm and producing an erect inflorescence with a few basal leaves.

In the center are three stamens and whitish sterile stamens known as staminodes.

Taxonomy

Nomenclature

The history of the scientific name of this species is somewhat tangled. The plant was first collected by Archibald Menzies during the Vancouver Expedition, and published as Hookera coronaria by Richard Salisbury in  Paradisus Londinensis early in 1808. However, Salisbury had fallen out with fellow botanist James Edward Smith. Smith first published a moss genus, Hookeria, and then published a description of Salisbury's Hookera coronaria as Brodiaea grandiflora.

If it was Smith's intention to replace Salisbury's name, as has been suggested, it was partly successful, since although Salisbury's Hookera coronaria has priority over Smith's Brodiaea grandiflora, names as similar as Hookera and Hookeria are considered to be confusing and a formal proposal to conserve the names Brodiaea and Hookeria over the name Hookera was accepted. However, Salisbury's epithet coronaria still stands since Smith's Brodiaea grandiflora is now considered to have been an illegitimate name when published. In 1917, after the Kew Rule had vanished from botanical nomenclature, Willis Jepson formally published the combination Brodiaea coronaria, now accepted as the botanical name for this species.

Synonyms
Synonyms, in full or in part, include:

 Hookera coronaria Salisb. (basionym)
 Hookera grandiflora (Sm.) Kuntze
 Brodiaea grandiflora Sm.
 Hookera rosea Greene
 Brodiaea rosea (Greene) Baker

Subspecies
There are two subspecies of this plant:
Brodiaea coronaria subsp. coronaria – crown brodiaea
Brodiaea coronaria subsp. rosea – Indian Valley brodiaea;  a rare pink-flowered subspecies endemic to a small region in the Inner North California Coast Ranges (Tehama, Glenn, and Lake Counties) in northwestern California.

Uses 
Native Americans and early European settlers of the continent harvested the small bulbs for food. They are edible raw, with a nutty or celery-like taste.

References

Further reading

External links

Jepson Manual Treatment — Brodiaea coronaria
CalFlora Database: Brodiaea coronaria (harvest brodiaea, crown brodiaea, early harvest brodiaea)
USDA Plants Profile for Brodiaea coronaria (crown brodiaea)
Brodiaea coronaria - U.C. Photos gallery

coronaria
Flora of British Columbia
Flora of California
Flora of Oregon
Flora of Washington (state)
Flora of the Cascade Range
Flora of the Klamath Mountains
Flora of the Sierra Nevada (United States)
Natural history of the California Coast Ranges
Plants described in 1808
Flora without expected TNC conservation status